Coprosma dodonaeifolia is a species plant native to north New Zealand.

The species has a chromosome number of 44. It is also closely related to Coprosma lucida.

References 

dodonaeifolia
Flora of New Zealand